This list of colossal squid specimens and sightings is a timeline of recorded human encounters with members of the genus Mesonychoteuthis, popularly known as colossal squid. It includes animals that were caught by fishermen, recovered (in whole or in part) from sperm whales and other predatory species, as well as those reliably sighted at sea. The list also covers specimens misidentified as colossal squid.

Background

The colossal squid (Mesonychoteuthis hamiltoni), which has a circum-Antarctic distribution in the Southern Ocean, is far less known than the distantly related, near-cosmopolitan giant squid (Architeuthis dux). Though a substantial number of colossal squid specimens have been recorded, the vast majority of these are only fragmentary remains such as disarticulated beaks. Xavier et al. (1999) collated 188 geographical positions for whole or partial specimens caught by commercial and scientific fisheries, but very few mature animals have ever been documented. O'Shea & Bolstad (2008) found 11 reports in which adult or subadult specimens had been described, and mentioned that at least 7 additional, "similarly sized" specimens were known to them; McClain et al. (2015) stated that only 12 "complete" specimens were known.

Early specimens
The earliest known specimens of this species are two brachial crowns (#1) recovered from the stomach of a sperm whale in the winter of 1924–1925, on the basis of which Guy Coburn Robson formally described Mesonychoteuthis hamiltoni in 1925. Apart from two partial specimens (#2 and 3) recovered from sperm whale stomachs in the mid-1950s—initially misidentified as belonging to the giant squid genus, Architeuthis—and a single juvenile individual of  mantle length (#4), little else was known about the species until additional specimens began receiving coverage in Russian-language scientific journals in the 1970s.

Emergence from obscurity
It would be more than two decades before another giant individual was collected: in March 2003, a complete specimen of a subadult female (#14) was found near the surface in the Ross Sea. It was this specimen that led teuthologist Steve O'Shea to coin the common name "colossal squid". A much smaller immature female (#15) was taken by trawl at  depth off Macquarie Island the same year. On 25 June 2005, a specimen was captured alive at a depth of  while taking Patagonian toothfish from a longline in South Georgian waters (#17). It was filmed alive at the surface.

Largest known specimen

The largest known complete specimen of the colossal squid—and the heaviest recorded extant cephalopod—was a mature female (#19) captured in the Ross Sea in February 2007. It is likely that the specimen, and particularly its tentacles, shrank considerably post mortem as a result of dehydration, having been kept in a freezer for 14 months. Both this and the 2003 specimen received significant media attention and did much to bring the species to public prominence; the following years saw a number of individuals of the more commonly encountered giant squid misidentified as colossal squid (e.g. #[1] and [2]).

Later developments
Perhaps the best video of a live colossal squid is that of an animal (#21) recorded at the surface in the D'Urville Sea off Antarctica in January 2008. The squid was pulled to the surface feeding on a line-caught toothfish. The video is likely the first to show a colossal squid swimming freely, and records the animal performing a slow roll on its longitudinal axis. Initially light-coloured, the squid quickly turned blood red (possibly a stress response) before returning to a light pink after lingering at the surface for a short time, thence slowly retreated to deeper water.

Its 3.5-hour dissection at the Museum of New Zealand Te Papa Tongarewa was live streamed on YouTube.

Since then, several more colossal squid have been filmed or photographed alive at the surface. But as far as is publicly known, the colossal squid has never been observed alive in its natural, deep-water habitat, although a number of such recordings of the giant squid have been made in recent years. As such, it is the only known extant species of truly giant (>) cephalopod that has never been filmed in its natural habitat.

List of colossal squid
Records are listed chronologically in ascending order and numbered accordingly. This numbering is not meant to be definitive but rather to provide a convenient means of referring to individual records. Specimens incorrectly identified as colossal squid are counted separately, their numbers enclosed in square brackets, and are highlighted in pink. Records that cover multiple colossal squid specimens, or remains of more than a single animal (e.g. two lower beaks), have the 'Material cited' cell highlighted in grey. Animals that were photographed or filmed while alive are highlighted in yellow. Where a record falls into more than one of these categories, a combination of shadings is used. Where an image of a specimen is available this is indicated by a camera symbol (📷) that links to the image.

 Date – Date on which the specimen was first captured, found, or observed. Where this is unknown, the date on which the specimen was first reported is listed instead and noted as such. All times are local.
 Location – Site where the specimen was found, including coordinates and depth information where available. Given as it appears in the cited reference(s), except where additional information is provided in square brackets. The quadrant of a major ocean in which the specimen was found is given in curly brackets (e.g. {SEA}; see Oceanic sectors).
 Nature of encounter – Circumstances in which the specimen was recovered or observed. Given as they appear in the cited reference(s).
 Identification – Species- or genus-level taxon to which the specimen was assigned. Given as it appears in the cited reference(s). Listed chronologically if specimen was re-identified. Where only a vernacular name has been applied to the specimen (e.g. "colossal squid" or a non-English equivalent), this is given instead.

  – Original specimen material that was recovered or observed. "Entire" encompasses all more-or-less complete specimens. Names of anatomical features are retained from original sources (e.g. "jaws" may be given instead of the preferred "beak", or "body" instead of "mantle"). The specimen's state of preservation is also given, where known, and any missing parts enumerated.
 Material saved – Material that was kept after examination and not discarded (if any). Information may be derived from outdated sources and therefore not current; the material may no longer be extant.
 Sex – Sex and sexual maturity of the specimen.
 Size and measurements – Data relating to measurements and counts. Abbreviations used are based on standardised acronyms in teuthology (see Measurements), with the exception of several found in older references. Measurements are given as they appear in the cited reference(s), with both arithmetic precision and original units preserved (though metric conversions are shown alongside imperial measurements).
 Repository – Institution in which the specimen material is deposited (based on cited sources; may not be current), including accession numbers where available. Institutional acronyms are those defined by Leviton et al. (1985) and Leviton & Gibbs (1988) (see Repositories). Where the acronym is unknown, the full repository name is listed. Type specimens, such as holotypes or syntypes, are identified as such in boldface.
 Main references – The most important sources, typically ones that provide extensive data on a particular specimen (often primary sources). Presented in author–date parenthetical referencing style, with page numbers included where applicable (page numbers in square brackets refer either to unpaginated works or English translations of originally non-English works; see Full citations). Figures ("figs.") and plates ("pls.") are also indicated where present.
  – Less important references that merely refer to the specimen without imparting substantive additional information (see Full citations), except where such are the only available sources, in which case they are listed under 'Main references'. Includes possibly unobtainable sources such as old newspaper articles and television broadcasts.
 Notes – Miscellaneous information, often including individuals and vessels involved in the specimen's recovery and subsequent treatment, and any dissections, preservation work or scientific analyses carried out on the specimen. Where animals have been recorded while alive this is also noted. Material not referable to the genus Mesonychoteuthis, as well as specimens on public display, are both highlighted in bold (as "Non-mesonychoteuthid" and "On public display", respectively), though the latter information may no longer be current.

Abbreviations

The following abbreviations are used in the List of colossal squid table.

Oceanic sectors

M. hamiltoni has a circumpolar Antarctic distribution.

SWA, Southwest Atlantic Ocean 
SEA, Southeast Atlantic Ocean 
SWP, Southwest Pacific Ocean 
SEP, Southeast Pacific Ocean 
SIO, Southern Indian Ocean

Measurements
Abbreviations used for measurements and counts are based on standardised acronyms in teuthology, primarily those defined by Roper & Voss (1983), with the exception of several found in older references.

ED, egg diameter
EL, "entire" length (end of tentacle(s), often stretched, to posterior tip of tail; in contrast to WL, measured from end of arms to posterior tip of tail)
EyD, eye diameter 
FL, fin length 
FW, fin width  
HL, head length (most often base of arms to edge of mantle) 
HW, head width
LD, lens diameter
LRL, lower rostral length of beak 
ML, mantle length (used only where stated as such) 
MW, maximum mantle width (used only where stated as such)
WL, "whole" length (end of arms, often damaged, to posterior tip of tail; in contrast to EL, measured from end of tentacles to posterior tip of tail)
WT, weight

Repositories
Institutional acronyms are those defined by Leviton et al. (1985) and Leviton & Gibbs (1988). Where the acronym is unknown, the full repository name is listed.

 BMNH, Natural History Museum, Cromwell Road, London, England (formerly British Museum (Natural History))
 NMNH, National Museum of Natural History, Smithsonian Institution, Washington, District of Columbia, United States
 NMNZ, Museum of New Zealand Te Papa Tongarewa, Wellington, New Zealand (formerly Colonial Museum; Dominion Museum)

Specimen images
The number directly below each image corresponds to the specimen or sighting, in the List of colossal squid, that the image depicts. The date on which the specimen was first captured, found, or observed is also given.

Notes

References

Short citations

Full citations

A

B

C

D

E

F

G

H

J

K

L

M

N

O

P

R

S

T

V

W

X

Y

Author unknown 

 
 
 
 
 
 
  
  
  
 
 

Squid
Lists of animal specimens